Astathes dimidiata is a species of beetle in the family Cerambycidae. It was described by Gory in 1844. It is known from Java, Borneo, Myanmar, Malaysia, and Thailand.

References

D
Beetles described in 1844
Beetles of Asia